The Knot (Italian: Il nodo) is a 1921 Italian silent film directed by Gaston Ravel and starring Elena Lunda, Carlo Gualandri, and Francesca Bertini.

References

Bibliography
 Ágnes Pethő. The Cinema of Sensations. Cambridge Scholars Publishing, 2015.

External links

1921 films
1920s Italian-language films
Films directed by Gaston Ravel
Italian silent feature films
Italian black-and-white films